Dolenje Selce is a village in the Municipality of Trebnje in eastern Slovenia. The area is part of the historical region of Lower Carniola. The municipality is now included in the Southeast Slovenia Statistical Region.

The local church is dedicated to Saint Anthony the Hermit and belongs to the Parish of Dobrnič. It was first mentioned in written documents dating to 1526. It was greatly remodelled in the Baroque style in the second half of the 17th century.

References

External links
Dolenje Selce at Geopedia

Populated places in the Municipality of Trebnje